Senadole is a village in the Municipality of Divača in the Littoral region of Slovenia.

Church

The local church is dedicated to the Holy Spirit and belongs to the Parish of Senožeče.

References

External links

Senadole on Geopedia

Populated places in the Municipality of Divača